WROC (950 kHz), currently branded as 95.7 The Fan, is an AM radio station licensed to Rochester, New York, airing a sports radio format. The format is closely affiliated with Buffalo sister station WGR, and carries content from CBS Sports Radio, the BetQL Network, and local shows, along with play-by-play from teams owned by Pegula Sports and Entertainment.  The station's studios are located at High Falls Studios downtown, and its transmitter tower is on Rochester's southside near the I-390/I-590 freeway interchange.

The station's call sign is a reference to WROC-TV; while the stations are not and have never been co-owned, WROC radio has an agreement with WROC-TV to provide local news coverage, and the borrowing of the WROC call sign from WROC-TV is included in this agreement. (The WROC call sign was previously used on 1280 kHz, now WHTK, which was originally co-owned with WROC-TV.)

History
WROC began broadcasting in 1947 under the callsign WARC. It was an early affiliate of the ABC radio network, but later changed to a locally programmed, personality-driven popular music station. It was purchased by the B. Forman regional department store chain in 1953 and changed its call letters to WBBF, the last three letters of which stood for "Buy B. Forman". In 1966 it was sold to LIN Broadcasting for what was then a market record of over $2 million, but retained its popular music format and personality lineup until the early 1980s.

As WBBF, 950 AM was a popular top 40 music station in Rochester, often leading the market in ratings surveys from the 1950s through the early 1970s, and ranking among the city's top stations through the late 1970s even after strong format competition arrived in 1972 from WAXC and later on the FM band from WPXY. Consistent success was achieved although as a relative latecomer to the AM band in the postwar era, WBBF's coverage area had to be restricted to the east and west to prevent interference with other stations on the same channel (WWJ in Detroit and WIBX in Utica).

In 1982, as hit music radio listeners were migrating to FM, the station evolved into a talk format. WBBF remained a talk station through the mid-1980s, then switched to an oldies format. Then in 1987, it became a Classic County station. As WBBF and later WEZO, from 1990 to 2000, the station carried an adult standards format. The WROC call sign was adopted in 2002 when the station adopted a second-tier conservative talk format featuring The Laura Ingraham Show and The Radio Factor; the station switched to progressive talk radio upon the launch of Air America Radio in 2004, a format it held until 2008, when it adopted its current sports format. The WBBF calls are now in use in Buffalo, New York.

On September 2, 2008, WROC affiliated with ESPN Radio and was branded "ESPN Rochester". On December 8, 2021, the station was rebranded as "95.7 The Fan", replacing ESPN content with content from Audacy-owned networks BetQL and CBS Sports Radio. Local programming on the station remained unchanged.

Programming
Aside from sports play-by-play, WROC runs a straight feed of CBS Sports Radio and the BetQL network outside a few programs (syndication of One Bills Live and The Sports Bar with Mike Danger and Gene Battaglia) on weekdays and some part of the morning hours on the weekends. Schopp and the Bulldog, the afternoon show based at WGR, was heard on WROC from 2008 to 2011, but was dropped in summer 2011 without explanation (Entercom had ended or outsourced its other syndicated offerings at the same time).

WROC carries the Buffalo Sabres and Buffalo Bills, both of which are also carried on WCMF-FM to improve the reach. WROC was also the exclusive radio home of the Rochester Knighthawks (WROC's Buffalo sister station, WWKB, is also the home of the Knighthawks' chief rival, the Buffalo Bandits). In January 2012 it was announced that WROC would be the AM home of the Buffalo Bills (WCMF-FM is the corresponding FM home). WROC (both AM and FM) entered into an agreement to carry the Rochester Americans, the Sabres' AHL affiliate, starting in 2016.

References

External links
FCC History Cards for WROC

Fybush.com WROC history

ROC
Sports radio stations in the United States
Radio stations established in 1947
1947 establishments in New York (state)
CBS Sports Radio stations
Audacy, Inc. radio stations